Microangelo may refer to the following computer related products:

 MicroAngelo, an early graphics card
 Microangelo Toolset, a collection of software utilities